Charles "Charlie" Hoehn (born May 28, 1986) is an American author, entrepreneur, and public speaker.

Early life
Hoehn was born on May 28, 1986, in Colorado. He graduated from Colorado State University in 2008.

Career
After graduating, Hoehn was disappointed with the lack of quality employment prospects. He participated in a virtual internship with Seth Godin. Later in the year, he worked for Ramit Sethi to assist him in his speaking gigs and the launch of his book, I Will Teach You To Be Rich.
 
In 2009, Hoehn published an e-book called Recession Proof Graduate. In 2011, Charlie delivered a speech entitled "The New Way to Work" at a TEDx event at Carnegie Mellon University, which was featured on NPR's TED Radio Hour.

Hoehn worked for Tim Ferriss until 2013. In 2014, Hoehn self-published his second book, Play it Away: A Workaholic’s Cure for Anxiety. In 2017, Hoehn raised $35,936 on Kickstarter for his self-published coffee-table book, Play for a Living: Quotes from People Who Found Joy in Their Work, and Changed the World.

Bibliography
 
 
 Charlie Hoehn and Mckenna Bailey (2017). Play for a Living: Quotes from People Who Found Joy in their Work, and Changed The World. .

References

External links
Personal website

American business writers
1986 births
Living people
Colorado State University alumni